Choniognathus is a genus of crabs in the family Majidae.

References 

Majoidea
Decapod genera